Spirit is an album by the American jazz trumpeter Malachi Thompson recorded and released by the Delmark label in 1983.

Reception

AllMusic reviewer Scott Yanow stated: "This is a varied advanced jazz set by trumpeter Malachi Thompson  ... the strong band plays five originals that cover a lot of different moods ... Worth exploring".

Track listing
All compositions by Malachi Thompson, except where indicated.
 "Spirit of Man" – 6:49
 "Back to the One" – 7:07
 "A Rising Daystar" – 7:07
 "Dhyia Malika" – 8:27
 "I Remember Clifford" (Benny Golson) – 7:53
 "Dearly Beloved" (John Coltrane) – 4:45 Additional track on CD reissue
 "No More Hard Times" – 4:30

Personnel
Malachi Thompson – trumpet 
Carter Jefferson – tenor saxophone
Albert Dailey – piano 
James King – bass
Nasar Abadey – drums 
Randy Abbott – congas
Arnae Burton (track 2), Leon Thomas (track 7) – vocals

References

1983 albums
Delmark Records albums
Malachi Thompson albums
Albums produced by Bob Koester